Roy Thomas "Shrimp" Worters (October 19, 1900 November 7, 1957) was a Canadian professional Hockey Hall of Fame goaltender who played twelve seasons in the National Hockey League for the Pittsburgh Pirates, Montreal Canadiens and New York Americans.

Worters recorded 66 shutouts in his career. At 5'3" (160 cm) tall, he was the shortest player ever to play in the NHL.

Playing career
Worters played junior ice hockey in Toronto with the Toronto Canoe Club Paddlers, winning the 1920 Memorial Cup, the national junior championship. He then spent several years in amateur and senior leagues, including the 1923–24 and 1924–25 seasons as the star netminder for the Pittsburgh Yellow Jackets of the United States Amateur Hockey Association, leading the Yellow Jackets to championships both seasons.  Bolstered by the success, the expansion Pittsburgh Pirates joined the NHL the following season, with Worters in goal and substantially the same lineup as the Yellow Jackets. Worters proved an iron man, playing three seasons for the Pirates and in virtually all of their games, showing great skill while backstopping a weak defensive team; in the Pirates' first season, Worters stopped 70 of 73 shots (setting a then-NHL record) in a 3–1 loss to the Americans.

Worters refused to sign with the Pirates for the 1927–28 season, and was suspended briefly before being traded to the Americans, for whom he would spend the rest of his career (save for a single game on loan to the Canadiens in 1930). His first season with the Americans saw Worters becoming the first goaltender to win the Hart Memorial Trophy with a 1.15 goals against average as he led the Americans to second place in the Canadian Division, after the team finished in last place the year before.

During his time with the New York Americans, Worters had a corps of large defencemen in front of him, including Bullet Joe Simpson, "Red" Dutton, and Lionel Conacher. Coincidentally, Conacher grew up in the same Toronto neighbourhood as Worters. The Americans would make the playoffs only once more during Worters' career, although he would win the Vezina Trophy in 1930–31 as the league's best goaltender.  During the ensuing contract negotiations following the season, Worters signed for $8,500 per season, an unprecedented sum for a goalie. He became the first goalie in NHL history to record back to back shutouts in his first two games for a new team.

While with the Americans, Worters was named team captain for the 1932–33 season.

In 1937, Worters needed hernia surgery and retired following the season. Roy Worters died of throat cancer on November 7, 1957. He was inducted into the Hockey Hall of Fame in 1969.

Awards and achievements
Hart Memorial Trophy Winner in 1929
Selected to the NHL Second All-Star Team in 1932, 1934
Vezina Trophy Winner in 1931
First NHL goalie to record back to back shutouts
Inducted to the Hockey Hall of Fame in 1969

Career statistics

Regular season and playoffs

References

External links

1900 births
1957 deaths
Canadian ice hockey goaltenders
Deaths from cancer in Ontario
Hart Memorial Trophy winners
Hockey Hall of Fame inductees
Montreal Canadiens players
National Hockey League goaltender captains
New York Americans players
Ontario Hockey Association Senior A League (1890–1979) players
Pittsburgh Pirates (NHL) players
Pittsburgh Yellow Jackets (USAHA) players
Ice hockey people from Toronto
Vezina Trophy winners
Canadian expatriate ice hockey players in the United States